The 2021–22 Iraq FA Cup was the 32nd edition of the Iraqi knockout football cup as a clubs-only competition, the main domestic cup in Iraqi football, featuring a record 168 clubs from the top four tiers of the Iraqi football league system, (20 from the Iraqi Premier League, 24 from the Iraq Division One and 124 from the Iraq Division Two and Iraq Division Three). The competition began on 10 September 2021 with the first-round matches involving teams from the third and fourth tiers, and the final was played on 16 July 2022 at Al-Madina Stadium in Baghdad.

The winners of the competition were Al-Karkh, who won their first title with a 2–1 victory over Al-Kahrabaa.

Teams
The Iraq FA Cup is a knockout competition with 168 participants: 20 teams from the Iraqi Premier League, 24 from the Iraq Division One, and 124 in total from the Iraq Division Two and Iraq Division Three.

Schedule 
The rounds of the 2021–22 competition were scheduled as follows:

First round 
Gharb Baghdad, Junoob Baghdad, Kara, Midya, Sahl Nineveh and Qazaniya received byes to the second round.
Baghdad Section

Central Euphrates Section

Al-Anbar Section

Mosul, Erbil and Duhok Section

Diyala and Salahaddin Section

Southern Section

Kirkuk and Sulaymaniya Section

Second round 
Al-Hashd Al-Shaabi received a bye to the third round.
Baghdad Section

Central Euphrates Section

Al-Anbar Section

Mosul, Erbil and Duhok Section

Diyala and Salahaddin Section

Southern Section

Kirkuk and Sulaymaniya Section

Third round
Haifa received a bye to the third round play-off.
Baghdad Section

Central Euphrates Section

Al-Anbar Section

Mosul, Erbil and Duhok Section

Diyala and Salahaddin Section

Southern Section

Kirkuk and Sulaymaniya Section

Third round play-off
Baghdad Section

Central Euphrates Section

Al-Anbar Section

Diyala and Salahaddin Section

Qualified teams
The following 24 teams qualified to the fourth round to be joined by 24 clubs from the Division One.

Fourth round
Al-Jinsiya, Masafi Al-Wasat, Suq Al-Shuyukh and Al-Muthanna received byes to the fifth round.
Baghdad Section

Southern and Central Euphrates Section

Northern and Western Section

Fifth round
Al-Sulaikh, Al-Sinaat Al-Kahrabaiya, Afak and Al-Sadeq received byes to the sixth round.
Baghdad Section

Southern and Central Euphrates Section

Northern and Western Section

Sixth round
Karbalaa, Masafi Al-Junoob, Al-Ramadi, Al-Sufiya, Peshmerga Sulaymaniya, Diyala and Al-Dujail received byes to the round of 32.
Baghdad Section

Southern and Central Euphrates Section

Sixth round play-off
Baghdad Section

Final phase

Bracket

Round of 32
The round featured 20 teams from the Premier League (level 1), 9 teams from Division One (level 2) and 3 teams from Division Two (level 3).

Round of 16 
The round featured 13 teams from the Premier League (level 1) and 3 teams from Division One (level 2).

Quarter-finals 
The round featured 7 teams from the Premier League (level 1) and 1 team from Division One (level 2).

Semi-finals 
All remaining teams are from the Premier League (level 1).

Final

Notes

References

External links
 Iraq Football Association

 
Cup
2021–22 Asian domestic association football cups